The 2014–15 Football League Trophy, was the 31st season in the history of the competition. It is a knock-out tournament for English football clubs in League One and League Two, the third and fourth tiers of the English football.

In all, 48 clubs entered the competition. It was split into two sections, Northern and Southern, with the winners of each section contesting the final at Wembley Stadium. Peterborough United were the defending champions, but were eliminated in the first round by Leyton Orient.

Bristol City of League One won the competition for a record third time, defeating rival League One side Walsall by 2–0 in the final at Wembley.

First round
The draw for the first round took place on 16 August 2014. Sixteen clubs were awarded a bye into the second round, and the remaining 32 clubs, including the holders, were divided into four geographical regions. All ties were played during the week commencing 1 September 2014.

Northern section

Byes
Bury, Port Vale, Tranmere Rovers, Walsall, Burton Albion, Doncaster Rovers, Hartlepool United, Sheffield United

Southern section

Byes
Bristol City, Exeter City, Northampton Town, Plymouth Argyle, Colchester United, Dagenham & Redbridge, Luton Town, Milton Keynes Dons.

Second round
The draw for the second round took place on 6 September 2014 on Sky Sports show Soccer AM. The sixteen clubs that received a bye joined the 16 winners from the first round and were divided into two geographical regions. All ties were played during the week commencing 6 October 2014.

Northern section

Southern section

Area quarter-finals
The draw for the area quarter-finals took place on 11 October 2014, on Soccer AM. The 16 winners from the second round and were divided into two geographical regions. All ties were played during the week commencing 10 November 2014.

Northern section

Southern section

Area semi-finals
The draw for the area semi-finals took place on 15 November 2014, on Soccer AM.

Northern section

Southern section

Area finals
The draw for the area finals took place on 11 December 2014. The first legs of the area finals were played during the week commencing 5 January 2015. The second legs of the area finals were played during the week commencing 2 February 2015.

Northern section

Southern section

Final

References

External links

EFL Trophy
Trophy
Trophy
Football League Trophy